Lisa Martine Kehler (née Langford; born 15 March 1967) is a female retired race walker from England.

Athletics career
Born in Wednesfield, Staffordshire, she competes for the Wolverhampton & Bilston Athletics Club. Kehler competed for Great Britain at the Olympic Games in 1992 and 2000.

She competed in five Commonwealth Games; she represented England and won a bronze medal in the 10 km event, at the 1990 Commonwealth Games in Auckland, New Zealand. Four years later she represented England again in the 10 km event, at the 1994 Commonwealth Games in Victoria, British Columbia, Canada. The third Games appearance was when she represented England in the 10 km event and she won a bronze medal, at the 1998 Commonwealth Games in Kuala Lumpur, Malaysia. A fourth medal (silver) came at the 2002 Commonwealth Games in Manchester and a fifth and final appearance ensued in 2010.

International competitions

References

 

1967 births
Living people
People from Wednesfield
British female racewalkers
English female racewalkers
Olympic athletes of Great Britain
Athletes (track and field) at the 1992 Summer Olympics
Athletes (track and field) at the 2000 Summer Olympics
Commonwealth Games silver medallists for England
Commonwealth Games bronze medallists for England
Commonwealth Games medallists in athletics
Athletes (track and field) at the 1990 Commonwealth Games
Athletes (track and field) at the 1994 Commonwealth Games
Athletes (track and field) at the 1998 Commonwealth Games
Athletes (track and field) at the 2002 Commonwealth Games
Athletes (track and field) at the 2010 Commonwealth Games
World Athletics Championships athletes for Great Britain
Medallists at the 1998 Commonwealth Games
Medallists at the 2002 Commonwealth Games